Christopher Green (born c. 1968 in Matlock, Derbyshire) is an English writer and performer whose work covers comedy, cabaret, theatre and live art.

Background
Green was born in Sheffield and grew up in Darley Dale and lives and works in London, England. His characters include country music singer Tina C and pensioner rapper Ida Barr.
Green got into comedy via television production and acting, after graduating from Goldsmiths College (University of London), with a degree in Drama and English. He is perhaps best known for his work as a character comedian, in a range of personas, and has toured worldwide to venues such as The Albert Hall and Sydney Opera House.

Main characters played

Tina C. is a faux country music singer whose performances cover a range of topics including sexual politics ("No Dick's As Hard As My Life"), geo-politics ("Tina C's Twin Tower Tribute"), and her bid to run in the 2008 presidential race in her show called "Manifesto". In a 2007 commission from the Adelaide Cabaret Festival for "Sorry Seems To Be The Hardest Word" Tina solves the Aboriginal tensions Down Under. A new series of the Tina C. BBC Radio 4 series was broadcast in late 2011, entitled Tina C, from Middle America to the Middle East. On 3 December 2015, BBC Radio 4 broadcast the first episode of a four-part series, Tina C: Herstory, which purported to trace the fictional character's life-story in words and music, with Dr Raj Persaud playing himself as the episode's guest interviewer.

Another character played by Green is Ida Barr, a self-proclaimed "world's first Music hall singer turned RnB rap superstar" who has performed her two solo shows, "Artificial Hip hop" and "Get Old or Die Tryin'" all over the world, on various UK tours, and on a variety of media. Artificial Hip Hop, the BBC Radio 4 series, was broadcast in late 2010.

Installation events
He was the British Library Artist in Residence 2012; in this appointment he investigated the history of hypnosis in the Library's collections.

Awards
Green won the Olivier Award for Best Entertainment 2004 for "Duckie's C'est Barbican!", a show which he devised and co-wrote with Mark Whitelaw, Ursula Martinez, Marisa Carnesky, Francesca Baglione and Simon Vincenzi, and with a score by Ian Hill, which was performed at the Barbican Pit.

References

External links
 https://www.theguardian.com/culture/video/2008/aug/21/tina.c Video of Tina C, aka Chris Green, talking about her show "Tick My Box", and her campaign for the US presidency.
 http://www.christophergreen.net Christopher Green's official homepage, includes full lists of other theatre/Film/TV and Radio productions by Green
 http://www.comedycv.co.uk/tinac/index.htm
 https://web.archive.org/web/20170529124307/http://tinac.net/ Official Tina C. page
 http://www.idabarr.net Official Ida Barr page
 http://www.duckie.co.uk Another project of Chris Green
 http://www.norfolkhospice.org.uk
 http://www.henrythe9.com

English male comedians
People from Matlock, Derbyshire
1960s births
Living people
Year of birth uncertain